Ephysteris deserticolella is a moth of the family Gelechiidae. It is found on Cyprus and in Ukraine (the Crimea), the south-eastern part of the European Russia, Turkey, Iran and Afghanistan.

References

Moths described in 1871
Ephysteris
Moths of Europe
Moths of Asia